Echinochrome A, 7-ethyl-2,3,5,6,8-pentahydroxy-1,4-naphthoquinone is a polyhydroxylated 1,4-naphthoquinone, a type of pigments commonly found in sea urchin shell ("test"), spine, gonads, coelomic fluid, and eggs, of sea urchin. These type of pigments are commonly known as spinochromes and are natural marine phenolic compounds with known and various clinical effects and modes of action.

First extracted from the sea urchin Scaphechinus mirabilis, it is the active substance of histochrome and Echino-A. Histochrome is used for ophthalmic diseases and Ischemic heart disease. Echino-A has been used in nutraceutical form to diminish glucose levels, cholesterol and tryglicerides. The unique properties and the absence of adverse effects of Echinochrome A as a potent antioxidant has made it the focus of intense scientific and clinical studied for more than 30 years.
The several hydroxyl groups have the ability to diminish reactive oxygen species (ROS) in the cells, preventing redox imbalance. Echinochrome A has been found to target ophtalmologic, cardiovascular, cerebrovascular, inflammatory and metabolic diseases through its biological functions by targeting specific molecular signals. The regulation effects produced by echinochrome A in the cells makes this molecule a candidate to improve health. Sea urchins are known for their health properties for centuries, for example in the "Materia medica" of the Ming Dynasty authored by Li Zhongli in 1647.

References 

1,4-Naphthoquinones
Hydroxynaphthoquinones
Polyols